The 2006–07 season was the 127th season of competitive football by Rangers.

Overview
Rangers played a total of 51 competitive matches during the 2006–07 season. After signs that supporter unrest was turning on Murray, on 9 February 2006, two days before the crucial Old Firm match, it was announced that Alex McLeish would leave his position as manager at the end of the 2005–06 season, and on 11 March, it was confirmed that former Lyon manager Paul Le Guen would indeed succeed him at the end of the season. Murray predicted a fruitful reign under Le Guen, describing his capture as "a massive moonbeam of success" for the club and promising, "we’ve got big plans."  He announced that the Frenchman would be given significant funds with which to strengthen the squad, with Rangers having announced an arrangement with sports retailer JJB Sports.

Known for unearthing and nurturing young talent, Le Guen made an immediate splash in the transfer market signing South African Under 19 player Dean Furman from Chelsea, and youngsters William Stanger and Antoine Ponroy from Rennes. While allowing Ibrox favourite Alex Rae to move to a new career as player-manager of Dundee, he has also signed Libor Sionko and Karl Svensson. Rangers had been strongly linked with a host of other players and signed midfielder Jeremy Clement from Lyon and goalkeeper Lionel Letizi from Paris St Germain as a replacement for the departing Ronald Waterreus. Senegal's World Cup 2002 midfield player Makhtar N'Diaye signed a one-year contract after a short trial period with the club. In all, he made eleven signings (of them only Saša Papac would be playing for the club the following season). Le Guen's signings including Filip Šebo, Karl Svensson, Libor Sionko and Lionel Letizi but they simply did not perform, while Jérémy Clément was to be in Glasgow for only six months.

Rangers' first match under Le Guen was a friendly against Irish Premier League champions Linfield on 6 July 2006 at Windsor Park, Belfast. Rangers won 2–0 with first half goals from Kris Boyd and Thomas Buffel. The squad flew out to South Africa on 9 July for a training camp where they played three matches, the first of which was a comfortable 4–0 win over local opposition with Charlie Adam netting a hat-trick. Rangers also defeated Jomo Cosmos 2–0 but, with a largely depleted starting line-up, they lost their final match 2–0 against Premier Soccer League champions Mamelodi Sundowns. Defender Fernando Ricksen did not take any part in the pre-season tour of South Africa due to what was described by the club as "unacceptable behaviour" on the flight to Johannesburg. Rangers returned to face English Premier League sides Middlesbrough and Bolton Wanderers where they won 1–0 and drew 1–1 respectively. The SPL opening day on 30 July proved fruitful for Paul Le Guen's Rangers as they defeated Motherwell 2–1 at Fir Park, thanks to an early strike from Libor Sionko and the winning header from Dado Pršo In Le Guen's first competitive game at Ibrox, Rangers were held to a 2–2 draw by Dundee United, having been forced to come back from two-goals down.

On 9 August, Fernando Ricksen went to Russian Premier League club Zenit St. Petersburg, the new club of ex-Rangers manager Dick Advocaat, on a season-long loan. In return, a friendly has been scheduled between the teams at Ibrox on 23 August. On 11 August Rangers signed Manchester United's 19-year-old winger Lee Martin on loan for a season. Rangers also recruited the services of Austrian Vienna defender Saša Papac while Marvin Andrews, Olivier Bernard, Robert Malcolm and Hamed Namouchi all departed.

By mid November, Rangers found themselves in third place, a full 15 points behind leaders Celtic. Sporadic wins were mixed with regular dropped points as the team struggled to find consistency in the early part of the season. Rangers did, however, start promisingly in the UEFA Cup, going on to become the first Scottish club to qualify from the UEFA Cup group stage in its three-year history. Domestic results and performances, however, continued to be inconsistent and in January 2007, Le Guen controversially stripped midfielder Barry Ferguson of the captaincy.

On 4 January 2007 Paul Le Guen left Rangers by mutual consent. This made him the club's shortest-serving manager, and the only one to leave the club without completing a full season in charge.

At the start of the season it had appeared that Murray had brought one of Europe's most talented young coaches to Ibrox, but unfortunately the Frenchman could not repeat his previous successes. Inconsistent form from the start in the league saw Rangers fall behind Celtic in the title race as early as October and they suffered the disappointment of going out of the League Cup at home to First Division side St Johnstone, losing 2–0. Le Guen left the club by mutual consent on 4 January 2007 and was replaced by Walter Smith, who began his second spell as manager of the club.

Immediately Smith began an overhaul at the club. He deemed the defence to be the main reason for Rangers poor season. The signings of defenders David Weir and Ugo Ehiogu soon followed, along with young midfielder Kevin Thomson from Hibernian. The side's form picked up and they ended the season in second place in the Scottish Premier League and recorded a brace of Old Firm wins over Celtic.

In the Scottish Cup, Rangers were beaten 3–2 to Dunfermline Athletic, in caretaker manager Ian Durrant's first and only game in charge.

Players

Squad information

Transfers

In

Total spending: £6.025m

Out

Total spending: £3.3m

Squad statistics

Goal scorers

Last updated: 20 May 2007
Source: Match reports
Only competitive matches

Disciplinary record

Last updated: 20 May 2007
Source: Match reports
Only competitive matches

Club

Board of directors

Coaching staff

Other staff

Matches

Scottish Premier League

UEFA Cup

Scottish Cup

League Cup

Friendlies

Competitions

Overall

Scottish Premier League

Standings

Results summary

Results by round

UEFA Cup

Group A

References 

Rangers F.C. seasons
Rangers